The Women's 10 kilometre pursuit biathlon competition at the 2002 Winter Olympics was held on 16 February, at Soldier Hollow. Competitors raced over four 2.5 kilometre loops and one 2.75 kilometre loop of the skiing course, shooting four times, twice prone and twice standing. Each miss was penalized by requiring the competitor to race over a 150-metre penalty loop.

The pursuit was a newly introduced race at the 2002 Olympics, with athletes starting in the same order, and with the same time gaps, as their finish in the sprint event a few days earlier. The top 60 from the sprint were eligible to enter, though three athletes of the top 60 opted not to start.

Results 
Kati Wilhelm, winner of the sprint race, started with a 16-second advantage over Uschi Disl, and nearly 40 seconds over her next chaser, Magdalena Forsberg. However, Wilhelm had also won the sprint at the 2001 World Championships, only to fail to medal in the pursuit, which was won by Liv Grete Skjelbreid-Poirée, starting 4th in Salt Lake. Forsberg had won the Overall and pursuit World Cups the previous season, as well as leading the 2001/02 World Cup, including winning each of the first three pursuit races of the year. Skjelbreid-Poirée was close to Forsberg in the rankings though, and had won the most recent World Cup event. Given that Forsberg and Skjelbreid-Poirée had also finished first and second at the test event in Salt Lake the year previous, both seemed serious threats to the top 3.

Wilhelm's lead was short-lived, as she missed three shots on her first attempts, falling quickly to 6th. Disl was unable to take advantage, though, missing two herself, meaning that Forsberg, who shot clear, held the lead after the shoot, followed by Skjelbreid-Poirée, who missed one shot, but still managed to emerge in second. On the second shoot, Forsberg missed her first, but with Skjelbreid-Poirée missing as well, the Swede was able to hold the lead. However, she was now pursued by Wilhelm, who rebounded from her early misses by shooting clear, along with Irina Nikulchina from Bulgaria and Slovenian Andreja Grašič, both of whom started well over a minute behind, but shot clear at each of the first two targets to sit in the top 4.

Skjelbreid-Poirée made up a lot of ground on Forsberg, and after both shot clear on the third lap, they left the range together. Nikulchina, shooting clear for a third time, was 5 seconds behind, while Grašič, also clear, was back by 15 seconds. Wilhelm, who came in second, missed her 4th shot of the race, falling to 5th, 30 seconds back, just ahead of a recovering Disl, France's Florence Baverel-Robert and a pair of Russians, Galina Kukleva and Olga Pyleva.
 
The final shoot produced some real drama. Skjelbreid-Poirée and Forsberg, now joined by Nikulchina, all missed twice. The group behind then took its shots, with the previous three all still working their way around the penalty loop. Baverel-Robert missed twice, while Disl's dismal shooting performance continued, as she missed three. Grašič and Kukleva also threw one wide, but Wilhelm and Pyleva each hit all five, and left together in first and second places. Forsberg, Skjelbreid-Poirée and Nikulchina also left within two seconds of each other, though more than 10 seconds after the leading two. In the end, Pyleva showed too much strength for Wilhelm, beating the German to the line by five seconds. In the race for bronze, Forsberg fell behind, and while Skjelbreid-Poirée was able to record the second best time on the last lap, it wasn't enough, as Nikulchina, who had participated in two Olympics as a cross-country skier, had the fastest time, and secured the bronze.

The race was started at 12:00.

References

Sports-Reference.com - Women's 10 km Pursuit - 2002 Olympics
Youtube video of the race

Women's biathlon at the 2002 Winter Olympics